Wes Olson (Wesley John Olson) (born 1960) is an independent researcher and author from Western Australia. His work has concentrated on military history.

He has researched HMAS Sydney, prior to and after discovery of the ship.
His most notable book is the history of Western Australian involvement in the Gallipoli campaign of the first world war.

Publications

References 

Australian military historians
Historians of Australia
Living people
1960 births